Sabonis is a Lithuanian surname. Notable people with the surname include:

 Arvydas Sabonis (born 1964),  Lithuanian retired professional basketball player and businessman
 Domantas Sabonis  (born 1996), Lithuanian professional basketball player

Lithuanian-language surnames